Tireh Bagh (also Romanized as Tīreh Bāgh; also known as Tīr-e Bāgh) is a village in Abarj Rural District, Dorudzan District, Marvdasht County, Fars Province, Iran. At the 2006 census, its population was 118, made up of 21 families.

References 

Populated places in Marvdasht County